Neil Donald Harrison (born 16 April 1962, Wolverhampton) is a top ranking cricket umpire based in Japan. He is one of two members of the International Cricket Council (ICC) East Asia Pacific Elite Umpires Panel from Japan.

Harrison umpired four matches at the 2009 Women's Cricket World Cup.

References

External links
ESPN photograph of Neil Harrison

1962 births
Sportspeople from Wolverhampton
English cricket umpires
English expatriates in Japan
Living people